Archabil Avenue is a motorway in Ashgabat, Turkmenistan. The eight-lane motorway has a length of 25.5 kilometres, and contains a dividing strip of more than 30 metres width.

History and architecture 
Archabil Avenue was built in 2004 by the Turkish company GAP Insaat. The avenue hosts the majority of Turkmenistan's ministry and departmental offices. Many newly built  cultural and business centres are located on the avenue. In April 2013, further construction by the Russian company "Vozrozhdeniye" began on the motorway.

Notable buildings and structures 

 Turkmen State Institute of Oil and Gas
 State Cultural Centre of Turkmenistan
 National Olympic Sport Palace
 Turkmen State Medical University named by Myrat Garryyev
 Ministry of Healthcare and Medical Industry of Turkmenistan
 Ashgabat Cancer Center
 UAE Embassy in Turkmenistan 
 Embassy of China in Turkmenistan 
 UN Regional Center for Preventive Diplomacy
 Ashgabat Flagpole
 National Dramatic Theatre named by Alp Arslan
 National Museum of Turkmenistan
 Ministry of Education of Turkmenistan
 Ministry of Foreign Affairs of Turkmenistan
 Monument to the Constitution of Turkmenistan
 Ministry of Justice of Turkmenistan
 Cultural and entertaining center "Alem"
 Ministry of Trade and Foreign Economic Relations
 Hotel "Archabil"
 State Concern "Turkmengas"
 Ministry of Building and Architecture
 State Agency of "Turkmenaragatnashyk"
 Ministry of Agriculture and Ecological Protection
 State Statistical Committee
 State Agency of "Turkmenautotransport"
 Ministry of Industry and Communications
 State Customs Service
 Ministry of Economy and Finance
 State Agency of "Turkmen Railways"

References

Links 
 Project in ILK Construction

Streets in Ashgabat